Chionodes sevir is a moth in the family Gelechiidae. It is found in North America, where it has been recorded from Massachusetts to Florida, Kentucky, Texas and North Carolina.

The larvae are leaf-tiers on Quercus species of the red oak group.

References

Chionodes
Moths described in 1999
Moths of North America